Charnock may refer to:

Places
Heath Charnock,  village in Chorley
Charnock, Sheffield, suburb of Sheffield
Charnock Richard, village in Chorley

People
Charnock (surname)